Mehlis gland ('mā-lis-) also called Shell gland, is primarily present surrounding the ootype of Platyhelminthes, and it is a part of the female reproductive organ of Platyhelminthes.

Shape and size
It is a unicellular gland of egg shape. The shape of Mehli's gland is almost round or shell shaped and is attached with the ootype through certain fatty members.

Etymology
It was so named as it was first discovered by German physician Karl Friedrich Eduard Mehlis (1796–1832).

Function
As a part of female reproductive organ it has an important role in guiding the ova out towards the passage ending in the uterus of flat worms. Thus, its secretion lubricates the passage of uterus through which ova move. It may play a part in eggshell formation.

See also
 Reproductive system of Trematoda
 Reproductive system of Flatworms

References

Platyhelminth anatomy